= Moon Fever =

American band

- Origin: Seattle, Washington, U.S.
- Genre: Hard rock
- Years active: 2020–present
- Members: Mitch Micoley; Dave Orton; Troy Wageman; Triston Bracht
- Past members: Cody Jasper; Gabe Maska; Joe Perez; Greg Garcia

Moon Fever is an American hard rock band based in Seattle, Washington.

== Members ==
=== Current members ===
- Mitch Micoley – lead guitar (2020–present)
- Dave Orton – bass (2022–present)
- Troy Wageman – drums (2022–present)
- Triston Bracht – lead vocals (2022–present)

=== Former members ===
- Cody Jasper – lead vocals (2020–2022)
- Gabe Maska – bass (2020–2022)
- Joe Perez – rhythm guitar (2020–2022)
- Greg Garcia – drums (2020–2022)

== Discography ==
=== Albums ===
- Forever Sleep (2025)

=== Singles ===
Title	Year	Peak chart positions	Albums
Title	Year	US Main.	Albums
"Live Fast Die Young"	2022	—	Forever Sleep
"I'm Gone"	2022	—	Forever Sleep
"Nothing Left to Lose"	2023	—	Forever Sleep
"Getting Loud"	2023	27	Forever Sleep
"Feels So Good"	2023	—	Forever Sleep
"Forever Sleep"	2024	24	Forever Sleep
"Make It Look Easy"	2024	—	Forever Sleep
"Scars"	2024	—	Forever Sleep
"Taking Cover"	2025	—	Forever Sleep
"Decayed"	2025	—	
"Masses"	2025	—	
"Rejects"	2026	—	
"Bury Me"	2026	24	

=== Music videos ===
Title	Year	Director
"Live Fast Die Young"	2022	Unknown
"I'm Gone"	2022	Unknown
"Nothing Left to Lose"	2023	Cody Ingram
"Getting Loud"	2023	Jim Louvau
"Forever Sleep"	2024	Jim Louvau and Tony Aguilera
"T.V. Skin"	2025	King Zabb
"Decayed"	2025	Cory Ingram
"Masses"	2026	Cory Ingram
"Rejects"	2026	Cory Ingram
